Mishael Abbott (born June 21, 1981 in Jefferson City, Missouri) is a female race car driver. In 2001, she began racing in Formula Mazda. In 2005, she drove in four Indy Pro Series races for Hemelgarn Johnson Motorsports with a best finish of 8th in her first race and 13th in points. In 2006, she made three starts for Michael Crawford Racing and despite finishing all three races, had a best finish of 12th. Since 2007 she has competed in Sports Car Club of America C Sports Racer, Formula Mazda, and Formula Atlantic competition.

She was the first female driver to compete in the  Indy Pro Series.

References

External links
 
 

Living people
1981 births
Sportspeople from Jefferson City, Missouri
Racing drivers from Missouri
Indy Lights drivers
Indy Pro 2000 Championship drivers
American female racing drivers